The Honolulu Challenger Singles division was a tennis tournament held in 2010. This division was for single tennis players. Michael Russell won in the final 6–0, 6–3 against Grega Žemlja.

Seeds

Draw

Finals

Top half

Bottom half

References

External links
Main Draw
Qualifying Draw

Honolulu Challenger - Singles
2010 Singles